Poulson is a surname. Notable people with the surname include:

 Brandon Poulson (born 1990), American baseball player
 John Poulson (1910–1993), British architect who caused a major political scandal
 Norris Poulson (1895–1982), mayor of Los Angeles, California